Federation of European Mineral Programs (FEMP) is a (legal) non-profit organisation (Stitching) founded by Hans de Ruiter in which leading mineral resource companies participate together with leading European Universities to support high level education in Europe for th future leaders in the mining and related raw materials processing industry. 

The Federation is the co-ordinating body for matters regarding education and research covering all aspects of Mineral Engineering in a large part of Europe.

Currently the focus is on the European Mining Course (EMC) which is a MSc. triple degree program.

The participating universities are: RWTH Aachen University (Germany), Aalto University (Finland), Montanuniversität Leoben (Austria) and TU Delft (Netherlands).

The programs are developed for the students of these universities, however open to all other suitable European or International Masters students. Since the start in 1996 over 800 students participated in the programs. 
One of the objectives of FEMP is to assist students financially with the extra cost, when being abroad. In order to be able to subsidise the students for these extra costs FEMP receives annual contributions from its members. Further information can be found at the website of FEMP 

Mining organizations